Linna is a village in Jõhvi Parish, Ida-Viru County in northeastern Estonia. It is located just east of the town of Jõhvi, around the Tallinn–Narva railway, and is bordered by the Tallinn–Narva road (E20) to the north. As of 2011 Census, the settlement's population was 28.

There's a concrete factory of Betoonimeister located in Linna village.

References

Villages in Ida-Viru County